Guitar Man is an Elvis Presley album released by RCA Records in January 1981. The album consists of ten songs that Presley's longtime producer, Felton Jarvis, took and re-imagined for a contemporary sound. The instrumentation and backing singers from the original recordings were stripped away for new instrumentation. The process began on January 15, 1980, and lasted through November 11, 1980, with 40 songs being reworked; a later CD reissue of the album included additional tracks from these sessions. Singer-songwriter Jerry Reed was recruited to lay down the guitar work on the new version of the song "Guitar Man", which he had done the same on the original Elvis recording in 1967. This time, instead of an acoustic guitar, Reed used an electric guitar that gave the song a more modern sound. In the United States, the album peaked at number 49 on the Billboard albums chart and number 6 on the Billboard country albums chart.

Track listing

References

 

1981 albums
Elvis Presley albums